Pietro Fenoglio (Turin, 3 May 1865 – Corio, 22 August 1927) was an Italian architect and engineer, considered one of the most important pioneers of Art Nouveau in Italy.

Fenoglio quickly grasped the ascendancy of Art Nouveau as it appeared in Italy at the turn of the century as the "Stile Floreale" or "Stile Liberty" (Liberty style, named after the British department store Liberty & Company, a major purveyor of Art Nouveau furniture and decorative arts), during a period when Italian architects were searching for a national style of modern architecture. He took advantage of the very favorable economic climate to become one of the style's most fervent supporters in northern Italy before the First World War. Building little after 1912, Fenoglio parlayed his success as a designer into a diverse set of economic ventures, eventually landing him the directorship of a bank in 1915.

Life and career
 Pietro Fenoglio was born in 1865 in Turin, four years after the modern unification of Italy into a single kingdom. His father Giovanni was an administrator, while his mother Giacinta (née Guillot) was the daughter of the former Préfect of Chambéry, who had moved to Turin after Chambéry had been annexed by France in the Treaty of Turin in 1860. After studying civil engineering under Carlo Ceppi at the Regia Scuola di Applicazione per gli Ingegneri di Torino (now the Politecnico di Torino), from which he graduated in 1889, he worked first for the firm of  Brayda, Boggio and Reyend before forming his own firm. His first independent commissions in the 1890s exhibited a Gothic-revival style reminiscent of the historical building traditions of Piedmont.

Sensing the fashion of the time, however, his interest subsequently turned to Art Nouveau, and after 1900 he became the leading protagonist of the style in Turin. Commissions in a period of rapid economic expansion and prosperity were plentiful and Fenoglio became extremely prolific, establishing his studio at 60, Via XX Settembre, where he designed some of the major Italian examples of Art Nouveau. Over the course of thirteen years he designed and built over three hundred projects for villas and palaces, many of which were concentrated in the area centered on the Corso Francia. Fenoglio's work became increasingly recognizable by his strategic use of pastel colors, the ornament that alternates between floral subjects and circular geometric elements, and from the wide use of cement frameworks combined with the sometimes-daring decorative elegance of iron and glass.

Fenoglio was also one of the organizers of the 1902 and 1911 International Expositions in Turin, but he was also active in the publishing field, numbering among the founders and serving as one of the most important contributors to the magazine L'architettura italiana moderna. At the same time, the intense spate of construction activity meant that he also became part of the emerging Turin industrial and financial bourgeoisie,  consolidating his influence in the construction sector. Fenoglio became vice-president of the well-known Impresa Porcheddu, of the Società Anonima Cementi del Monferrato, and a partner in the Accomandita Ceirano & Company, and managing director of the emerging Banca Commerciale Italiana.

 Among Fenoglio's best known works are the Villino Raby (1901); the famous Villa Scott (1902), a triumph of loggias, turrets, bay windows and oriels; and, above all, his own home, the Casa Fenoglio-Lafleur (1902); considered by many to be "the most significant example of liberty style in Italy."

Other buildings worthy of note that reproduce decorative elements deriving from the success of the Casa Fenoglio-Lafleur are the Casa Galateri, one of the many commissioned by the same client, recognizable for the remarkable oriel bay overlooking the Via Cibrario; and the no-less-remarkable Casa Rossi-Galateri on the Via Passalacqua. Fenoglio was especially known for the number of Art Nouveau apartment buildings during this period: Casa Rossi Galateri (1903), Casa Rey (1904), Casa Boffa/Costa (1904), Casa Macciotta (1904), Casa Balbis (1905), Casa Ina (1906), Casa Guelpa (1907), and the council houses of via Marco Polo (1904), realized in collaboration with the architects Vicary and Molli. Outside Piedmont, he designed the villa of Magno Magni in Canzo, near Como.

After 1904, his work as a designer expanded into the nascent world of Italian industry, which found Turin a favorable place to establish new companies. Among the best known commissions of Fenoglio's industrial architecture are the Conceria Fiorio (1900), the Stabilimento Boero (1905), the Fonderie Ballada (1906), the car factory of Officine Diatto (1907) and the large building of the first Italian brewery Bosio & Caratsch, with the attached manor house (1907). Thanks to his newly-acquired experience in the field of industrial plant design, Fenoglio was also entrusted with of the vast project of the Leumann Village, the working-class neighborhood in nearby Collegno where, in addition to the Cotonificio Leumann, he built the houses and the school and the church of Santa Elisabetta, one of the handful of ecclesiastical structures in the world built in Art Nouveau. In the Monferrato area, together with the engineer Giovanni Antonio Porcheddu, he designed the first factory for the fiber cement company Eternit di Borgo Ronzone.

Fenoglio's activities were not confined to that of an esteemed professional designer. He was also politically active, holding positions as city councilman and consultant for the study of the new town plan that was completed in 1908. In 1912 he also joined the Board of Directors of the Banca Commerciale Italiana and in 1915, when the then-managing director Otto Joel was removed from his position due to his German origins, which were incompatible with the nationalistic climate following Italian entry into the First World War, he was replaced by Fenoglio himself along together with Giuseppe Toeplitz.  In 1917 they were elected managing directors. In this capacity Fenoglio continued to promote quality architecture by actively participating in the bank's expansion and construction of branch offices, including eventually the construction of the new headquarters in Piazza Colonna in Rome, for which he appointed young Marcello Piacentini as director of works. Piacentini soon became the one of the principal figures in the emergence of the rationalist architecture that characterized the next twenty years in Italy.

Principal Works

Turin

Zona Centro
 Palazzina Rossi Galateri (1903), via Passalacqua 14
 Casa Balbis (1905), via Balbis 1
 Casa Florio (1907), via Monte di Pietà 26

Zona Francia (Cit Turin e San Donato)
 Conceria Fiorio (1900), via Durandi, corner with via San Donato
 Villino Raby (1901), corso Francia 8
 Casa Fenoglio-Lafleur (1902), corso Francia 12, corner with Via Principi d'Acaja
 Casa Pecco (1902), via Cibrario 12
 Former Birrificio (brewery) Metzger (1903), via San Donato 68, corner with via Bogetto[
 Casa Macciotta (1904), corso Francia 32
 Casa Ina (1906), via Principi d'Acaja 20
 Casa Masino (1906), via Piffetti 7 bis
 Former Birrificio (brewery) Bosio & Caratsch and attached villa (1907), corso Regina Margherita 165, corner of via Bonzanigo
 Casa Padrini (1900), Via Cibrario 9

Zona Crocetta
 Casa Guelpa (1903), via Colli 2
 Casa Boffa-Costa (1905), via De Sonnaz 16
 Casa Besozzi (1896), via Papacino, corner with via Revel
 Casa Buzzani (1897), via Pastrengo 26
 Casa Debernardi (1903), via Colli 12, corner with via Vela
 Casa Boffa-Costa (1901), via Sacchi 28, corner with via Legnano
 Casa Boffa-Costa (1903), via Papacino 6, corner with via Revel
 Casa Bellia (1904), via Papacino 2, corner with corso Matteotti
 Casa Debernardi (1904), via Magenta 55, corner with via Morosini
 Casa Perino (1904), via San Secondo 70
 Casa Boffa-Costa-Magnani (1905), via De Sonnaz 16, corner with via Papacino
 Casa Rey (1906), corso G. Ferraris, 16/18
 Case popolari di via Marco Polo (1907)
 Via Sacchi 40 e 42 (1904)

Zona San Paolo
 Former stabilimento Società Anonima Diatto - A. Clément (1905), via Moretta 55

Zona Aurora
 Former Officine (offices) of Grandi Motori (1899), via Luigi Damiano
 Former (factory) Fabbrica nazionale Carte da Parati già Barone Ambrogio e figlio (1906-1908), corso Vigevano 33
 Former (foundry) Fonderie Ballada (1906), via Foggia 21

Zona Nord (Borgata Vittoria)
 Conceria Boero (1905), via del Ridotto 5[20]

Zona collinare (Borgo Po)
 Villa Scott (1902), corso G. Lanza 57

Savona
 Villa Zanelli (1907), (with Guttardo Gussoni)

Notes

Bibliography
 Guido Montanari, "Pietro Fenoglio," in Dizionario biografico degli italiani, vol. 46. Rome: Istituto dell'Enciclopedia Italiana, 1996. URL consultato il 22 novembre 2011.
 Riccardo Nelva and Bruno Signorelli, Le opere di Pietro Fenoglio nel clima dell'art nouveau internazionale,''' Bari: Dedalo Libri, 1979.
 Clara Bertolini Cestari, Manuel Fernando Ramello, and Gian Mario Rossino, "Metodi e strumenti per la conoscenza di un patrimonio industriale: il caso di Morano Sul Po," in XIII Congresso TICCIH,'' 2006.

Architects from Turin
20th-century Italian architects
Art Nouveau architects
Buildings and structures in Turin
Art Nouveau
Italian designers
Engineers from Turin
1865 births
1927 deaths